The Defence School of Marine Engineering is the marine engineering school for the Royal Navy in Gosport, Hampshire.

History
It is situated on the former RAF Gosport, which was transferred to the Navy in 1945.

A new Submarine Training Facility in Scotland, will see the nuclear engineering training move from the Gosport site from 2023.

Visits
Anne, Princess Royal visited the site on Tuesday 18 February 1992. Katharine, Duchess of Kent visited on Wednesday 14 July 1993 at 10am.

Structure

Training
The site includes much nuclear engineering, taught in collaboration with the University of Surrey.

Its training is recognised by the Institute of Marine Engineering, Science and Technology.

It is part of the Nuclear Technology Education Consortium NTEC, which was founded in 2003 and funded by the EPSRC and headquartered in Manchester. The University of Manchester has done the most nuclear engineering research in the UK.

It teaches people from other Commonwealth navies.

See also
 Defence School of Aeronautical Engineering
 Naval Engineering School of the Irish Naval Service at the National Maritime College of Ireland

References

Education in Hampshire
Engineering education in the United Kingdom
Gosport
Marine engineering schools
Training establishments of the Royal Navy